This is an incomplete list, which may never be able to satisfy certain standards for completion.

There are many conditions of or affecting the human hematologic system—the biological system that includes plasma, platelets, leukocytes, and erythrocytes, the major components of blood and the bone marrow.

Anemias

An anemia is a decrease in number of red blood cells (RBCs) or less than the normal quantity of hemoglobin in the blood. However, it can include decreased oxygen-binding ability of each hemoglobin molecule due to deformity or lack in numerical development as in some other types of hemoglobin deficiency.

Anemia is the most common disorder of the blood. There are several kinds of anemia, produced by a variety of underlying causes. Anemia can be classified in a variety of ways, based on the morphology of RBCs, underlying etiologic mechanisms, and discernible clinical spectra, to mention a few. The three main classes of anemia include excessive blood loss (acutely such as a hemorrhage or chronically through low-volume loss), excessive blood cell destruction (hemolysis) or deficient red blood cell production (ineffective hematopoiesis). Based on 2005-2006 estimates, the Centers for Disease Control and Prevention has stated that approximately 5.5 million Americans a year are either admitted to a hospital or seen by a physician, with some form of anemia as their primary diagnosis.

Symptoms of anaemia include Plummer–Vinson syndrome, candidal infections. Altered taste sensation, smooth, red painful burning sensation of tongue, filiform followed by fungiform papillae atrophy may also be seen. Others include generalized stomatitis, angular cheilitis and gingivitis.

Oral manifestation of anemia include angular cheilitis, generalized stomatitis, candidiasis and gingivitis. There will be pallor of lips and oral mucosa. Patients might have a smooth, red painful tongue, experience burning sensation of tongue or disturbed taste sensation. Atrophy of filiform and fungiform papillae may also occur.

Nutritional anemias
A nutritional anemia is a type of anemia that can be directly attributed to either a nutritional disorder or a nutritional deficiency.

Non-nutritional (hemolytic, aplastic and other) anemias

Blood cancers

A blood cancer or hematological malignancy is a type of malignant cancer that originates, affects, or involves the blood, bone marrow, or lymph nodes. These cancers include leukemias, lymphomas, and myelomas. These particular types of cancers can arise as defected mature cell types that have differentiated from hematopoietic precursor cells (often in the bone marrow) and begin to quickly proliferate through the bloodstream where it can then often infiltrate other organs and tissues. Others can involve the formation of tumors from lymphoblasts from within the lymphoid tissue. Incidence of affected people with a form of blood cancer has been steady increasing over recent years; however, due in part to early detection methods and subsequent advancements in the treatment of the diseases, mortality rates have continued to decrease.

Lymphoma

Leukemia
Leukemia is a malignancy producing of white blood cells in bone marrow. It can be a serious disease if not treated early.
Sometimes it can be cured by chemotherapy or stem cell treatment. It can affect our bloodstream, skin, lymph nodes, heart, and brain.

Myeloma

Malignant Immunoproliferative Diseases

Coagulation, purpura, and other hemorrhagic conditions
is also related with Blood Clot

Infection-related
Hematological disorders may be caused by a number of infection-related conditions involving the introduction of microorganisms into the host, such as bacteria, viruses, microfilaria, fungus and protozoa.

Bacterium-related

Protozoan-related

Immune system regulation-related

Immunodeficiency with predominantly antibody defects

References

Medical lists
Lists of diseases
Blood disorders